Uncommon Sense with Charlamagne is a talk show that aired weekly on MTV2 hosted by on-air personality Charlamagne Tha God. Uncommon Sense with Charlamagne featured a panel of guests who discussed current events in politics and the media. The show ran for three years for a total of 41 episodes.

References

External links
 Official website

American television talk shows
MTV original programming